Geghatap is an abandoned village in the Dilijan Municipality of the Tavush Province of Armenia. The village was populated by Azerbaijanis before the exodus of Azerbaijanis from Armenia after the outbreak of the Nagorno-Karabakh conflict.

Etymology 
The village was formerly known as Chichakbulag and was renamed Geghatap in 1991.

References

External links 

Former populated places in Tavush Province